Mohammadabad Golshan (also Romanized as Moḩammadābād Golshan) is a village in Yazdanabad Rural District, Yazdanabad District, Zarand County, Kerman Province, Iran. At the 2006 census, its population was 24, in 8 families.

References 

Populated places in Zarand County